Cyril James O'Brien (26 August 1912 – 19 March 1992) was an Australian rules footballer who played with Richmond in the Victorian Football League (VFL).

O'Brien later served as a Staff Sergeant in the Australian Army during World War II.

Notes

External links 
		

1912 births
1992 deaths
Australian rules footballers from Victoria (Australia)
Richmond Football Club players